Nettissery is a residential area situated in the City of Thrissur in Kerala state of India. Nettissery is Ward 16 of Thrissur Municipal Corporation.

See also
Thrissur
Thrissur District
List of Thrissur Corporation wards

References

Suburbs of Thrissur city